In Tibetan cuisine, a xogoi momo is a type of momo using mashed potato with dough, shaped into balls, with a minced meat filling, served with bread crumbs.

See also
 List of Tibetan dishes

References

Tibetan cuisine
Potato dishes